Ko Khram, also known as Ko Khram Yai, is an island in Bangkok Bay about 24 km south southwest of Pattaya. It is the largest of the eastern seaboard islands of Thailand and the largest island in the bay.

Geography
Ko Khram is thickly wooded and uninhabited. It has a length of 5.7 km and its maximum width is about 4 km. The island's coast is formed by rocky cliffs with white sandy beaches in between.

This island marks the southeasternmost point of the Bay of Bangkok, on the east side of the Gulf of Siam. Administratively Ko Khram belongs to Sattahip District, Chonburi Province.

Ko Khram is separated from the shore by a 3.4 km wide sound. Both this island and the smaller islands and islets surrounding it, as well as the adjacent coast, are a military area belonging to the Royal Thai Navy base at Sattahip and are off limits for tourists. The island's beaches are designated sea turtle conservation areas.

Adjacent islands
Other islands of the Ko Khram group include the following, among some minor rocks and islets:

Not part of the group, Ko Rin (เกาะริน) is an island farther offshore, 11 km to the NW of Ko Khram's northernmost point.

See also
List of islands of Thailand

References

External links

Khram
Sattahip District
Geography of Chonburi province
Islands of the Gulf of Thailand